Benbush is an unincorporated community and coal town in Tucker County, West Virginia, United States. Benbush is located to the northwest of Thomas along West Virginia Secondary Route 18.

The community derives its name from Benjamin Bush, a businessperson in the coal mining industry.

References 

Unincorporated communities in Tucker County, West Virginia
Unincorporated communities in West Virginia
Coal towns in West Virginia